This is a list of the most expensive celebrity photographs as determined by the fees paid to the subjects, or often their parents, for permission to publish them.

References 

Photographs, Celebrity
Most Expensive Celebrity
Photographs